Koszykarski Klub Sportowy Lech Poznań (Basketball Sports Club Lech Poznań) was the professional basketball section of the Polish multi-sports club of Lech Poznań.

History 
The club was established in 1922, with the basketball section founded in 1930. They competed in the Polish League until the summer of 1997, when due to financial and organizational problems, the club was withdrawn from the national league.

In European-wide competitions, a great achievement for Lech Poznań was its qualification to the EuroLeague's last 8 stage of the 1989–90 season, along with other clubs such as: Maccabi Tel Aviv, Olimpia Milano, Barcelona, Jugoplastika Split, Aris Thessaloniki, and Limoges.

Honours, titles and achievements

Men's

Polish League
Gold medal with championship (11): 1935, 1939, 1946, 1948–49, 1950–51, 1954–55, 1957–58, 1982–83, 1983–84, 1988–89, 1989–90
Silver medal with runner-up (7): 1937, 1948, 1950, 1961, 1982, 1985, 1991
Bronze medal with 3rd place (7): 1938, 1947, 1956, 1959, 1987, 1988, 1994

Polish Cup
 Winners (4): 1935–36, 1953–54, 1954–55, 1983–84
 Finalists (3): 1970, 1975, 1977

European Champions Cup
 Semifinalists (1): 1958-1959
 Quarterfinalists (1): 1989-1990

Junior Polish Championship
Gold medal with championship (4): 1952, 1966, 1983, 1991
Silver medal with runner-up (2): 1960, 1964
Bronze medal with 3rd place (1): 1993

Women's

Polish League
Gold medal with championship (1): 1957
Silver medal with runner-up (3): 1955, 1956, 1990
Bronze medal with 3rd place (5): 1958, 1971, 1972, 1973, 1984

Junior Polish Championship
Gold medal with championship (4): 1955, 1956, 1962, 1994
Silver medal with runner-up (1): 1963
Bronze medal with 3rd place (1): 1993

References

Basketball teams in Poland
Basketball teams established in 1922
Sport in Poznań